Francophone literature is literature written in the French language. The existence of a plurality of literatures in the French language has been recognised, although the autonomy of these literatures is less defined than the plurality of literatures written in the English language. Writings in the French language from Belgium, Canada and Switzerland were recognised as belonging to distinct traditions long before writings from colonial territories of France. Writing in French by Africans was formerly classified as "colonial literature" and discussed as part of colonial studies for its ethnographical interest, rather than studied for its literary merit. Any texts in French from the colonies and territories that were considered to have merit were subsumed under the classification of French literature. The nature and importance of Francophone literature in various territories of the former French Empire depends on the concentration of French settlers, the length of time spent in colonial status, and how developed indigenous languages were as literary languages. It was only following the Second World War that a distinction started to be made in literary studies and anthologies between French literature and other writing in French. In 1960 Maurice Bémol published Essai sur l'orientation des littératures de langue française au XXe siècle; the plural in the title emphasised the study's new approach of examining the level of autonomy of the languages.

Paris remains the most powerful centre of Francophone publishing, although important publishers have developed elsewhere, notably in Quebec where influential publishing houses have long attracted Francophone writers from across the world.

The term has historically been used to refer only to literature from Francophone countries outside France, but modern usage includes any literature written in French. Francophone literature therefore applies to the whole French-speaking world in the broadest sense of the term.

By Country 
Francophone literature may refer to aspects of:

Literature of French-speaking European countries
Literature of France
Literature of Belgium
Literature of the Grand Duchy of Luxembourg
Literature of Switzerland
Literature of Canada
List of French Canadian writers from outside Quebec
Literature of Quebec
List of Quebec authors
Literature of Louisiana
Literature of the French Caribbean countries and dependencies
Literature of Guadeloupe
Literature of Haiti
Literature of Martinique
Literature of Francophone Africa
Literature of Algeria
Literature of Benin
Literature of Burkina Faso
Literature of Burundi
Literature of Cameroun
Literature of the Central African Republic
Literature of Chad
Literature of the Comoros
Literature of the Democratic Republic of the Congo
Literature of the Republic of the Congo
Literature of Côte d'Ivoire
Literature of Djibouti
Literature of Gabon
Literature of Guinea
Literature of Madagascar
Literature of Mali
Literature of Mauritania
Literature of Mauritius
Literature of Morocco
Literature of Niger
Literature of Rwanda
Literature of Réunion
Literature of Senegal
Literature of the Seychelles
Literature of Togo
Literature of Tunisia
Postcolonial literature
List of African writers (by country)
Francophone literature of countries in Asia
Literature of Lebanon (see: Écrivains libanais francophones)
Literature of Cambodia
Literature of Laos
Literature of Vietnam

Francophone writers
List of French language poets
List of French language authors
Georges Simenon (Belgium)
Maurice Maeterlinck (Belgium)
Jacques Roumain (Haiti)
Léopold Sédar Senghor (Senegal)
Blaise Cendrars (Switzerland)
Émile Nelligan (Canada)

See also
Francophonie

References

French-language literature
French-language culture